James Anthony Tapp (April 18, 1918 – November 20, 2004) was a Canadian broadcaster.

He began his career with closed-circuit radio broadcasts aboard  in World War II. He later became a radio announcer in Montreal. He went on to host a number of early CBC Television shows, including Flashback and The Tapp Room. During the 1960s, he was host of CTV's game show A Kin to Win and the voice for Hercules in the animated series The Mighty Hercules.

He was inducted into the Canadian Association of Broadcasters Hall of Fame on November 29, 2004.

He died on November 20, 2004 of pneumonia in Oakville, Ontario at the age of 86.

References

External links
 

1918 births
2004 deaths
Deaths from pneumonia in Ontario
Canadian radio personalities
Canadian male voice actors